Secret Love may refer to either a secret admirer or:

Film, TV and theatre 
 Secret Love (1916 film), directed by Robert Z. Leonard
 Secret Love (1994 film), directed by Edgardo "Boy" Vinarao
 Secret Love (2010 film), directed by Ryu Hoon-i
 Secret Love (South Korean TV series), a 2013 South Korean TV drama
 Secret Love (Armenian TV series), an Armenian romantic melodrama television series
 Secret-Love, or The Maiden-Queen, a 1667 play by John Dryden
 A Secret Love, a 2020 documentary film directed by Chris Bolan

Music

Albums 
 Secret Love (Tete Montoliu album), 1977
 Secret Love (Lorrie Morgan album), 1998

Songs 
 "Secret Love" (Bee Gees song), 1991
 "Secret Love" (Doris Day song), 1953
 "Secret Love" (Kim Sozzi song), 2010
 "Secret Love" (Stevie Nicks song), 2011
 "Secret Love" (B.A.P song), 2012
 "I Am Who I Am/Secret Love", by Lee Ryan
 "Secret Love", by The Balham Alligators from Gateway to the South
 "Secret Love", by Hunter Hayes from Storyline
 "Secret Love", by Kelly Price from Soul of a Woman
 "Secret Love", by Mariah Carey from The Emancipation of Mimi
 "A Secret Love", by Toto from Hydra

See also 
 "Secret Love Song", a 2016 song by Little Mix
 "Secret Lovers", a 1985 song by Atlantic Starr
 The Secret Lovers, a 2005 South Korean TV drama
 The Secret Lovers (novel), a 1977 novel by Charles McCarry